Agios Athanasios is a settlement in the Xanthi regional unit of Greece. It is part of the municipality of Topeiros, and the community Toxotes.

Populated places in Xanthi (regional unit)